Luiz Henrique de Souza Santos or simply Luiz Henrique (born September 23, 1982) is a Brazilian former footballer.

External links

1982 births
People from Campo Grande
Sportspeople from Mato Grosso do Sul
Living people
Brazilian footballers
Association football defenders
Esporte Clube Santo André players
Associação Portuguesa de Desportos players
Nacional Atlético Clube Sociedade Civil players
Rio Branco Esporte Clube players
MKE Ankaragücü footballers
Kasımpaşa S.K. footballers
Bucaspor footballers
Boluspor footballers
Nacional Atlético Clube (SP) players
Campinense Clube players
Süper Lig players
TFF First League players
Campeonato Brasileiro Série D players
Brazilian expatriate footballers
Expatriate footballers in Turkey
Brazilian expatriate sportspeople in Turkey